Poona Gymkhana Ground is a multi purpose stadium in Pune, Maharashtra. The ground is mainly used for organizing matches of football, cricket and other sports. The ground has  the India's second first-class match played in 1892.

The ground hosted two first-class matches  in 1892 when Europeans cricket team played against Parsees cricket team. The ground also hosted 1939/40 Ranji Trophy Final when Maharashtra cricket team played against United Provinces cricket team. Since then the stadium has hosted non-first-class matches.

References

External links 

 cricketarchive
 cricinfo

Cricket grounds in Maharashtra
Multi-purpose stadiums in India
Cricket grounds in Pune
Sport in Pune
Sports venues in Pune
Sports venues in Maharashtra
Sports venues completed in 1892
1892 establishments in India

Cricket in Pune